During the 1999–2000 English football season, Swindon Town F.C. competed in the Football League First Division.

Season summary
Swindon's financial problems came to a head during the 1999–2000 season when in January 2000 Swindon—£4m in debt and losing £25,000 a week—went into administration for the first time. Chairman Rikki Hunt was forced to resign and 15 members of staff were made redundant. At one point manager Jimmy Quinn was told not to pick midfielder Robin Hulbert because one more appearance would trigger a  £25,000 payment to Everton under the terms of his 1996 transfer. Swindon's future was safeguarded when a consortium headed by business tycoon Terry Brady took over the club and they came out of administration towards the end of the season. But it was too late to save Swindon's place in Division One — they had already been relegated in bottom place. The club's new owner sacked manager Jimmy Quinn and appointed Colin Todd — who had won promotion to the Premiership with Bolton in 1997 — as manager, in hope of getting the club's fortunes back on track.

Final league table

Results summary

Results by round

Results
Swindon Town's score comes first

Legend

Football League First Division

FA Cup

League Cup

Squad

Left club during season

References

 Swindon Town squad for 1999–2000 season

Swindon Town F.C. seasons
Swindon Town F.C.